Towner is a city in McHenry County, North Dakota. It is the county seat of McHenry County. The population was 479 at the time of the 2020 census. It is part of the Minot Micropolitan Statistical Area. Towner was founded in 1886.

History
Towner sprang up in 1886 with the arrival of the Great Northern Railway into the area. It was named for rancher O. M. Towner.

Geography
Towner is located at  (48.345208, -100.406036).

Demographics

2010 census
As of the census of 2010, there were 533 people, 267 households and 149 families residing in the city. The racial make-up was 96.6% White, 1.9% Native American, 0.6% from other races, and 0.9% from two or more races. Hispanic or Latino of any race were 5.3% of the population.

There were 267 households, of which 22.1% had children under the age of 18 living with them, 43.4% were married couples living together, 9.0% had a female householder with no husband present, 3.4% had a male householder with no wife present, and 44.2% were non-families. 41.6% of all households were made up of individuals, and 24.4% had someone living alone who was 65 years of age or older. The average household size was 2.00 and the average family size was 2.69.

The median age was 49.9 years. 20.5% of residents were under the age of 18; 5.3% were between the ages of 18 and 24; 18.1% were from 25 to 44; 29.1% were from 45 to 64; and 27% were 65 years of age or older. The gender makeup of the city was 48.6% male and 51.4% female.

2000 census
As of the census of 2000, there were 574 people, 295 households and 158 families residing in the city. The racial make-up was 97.91% White, 0.35% African American, 0.35% Native American, and 1.39% from two or more races. Hispanic or Latino of any race were 0.87% of the population.

There were 295 households, of which 18.3% had children under the age of 18 living with them, 44.7% were married couples living together, 6.4% had a female householder with no husband present, and 46.4% were non-families. 42.0% of all households were made up of individuals, and 23.1% had someone living alone who was 65 years of age or older. The average household size was 1.95 and the average family size was 2.66.

17.1% of the population were under the age of 18, 6.1% from 18 to 24, 20.7% from 25 to 44, 27.2% from 45 to 64, and 28.9% who were 65 years of age or older. The median age was 50 years. For every 100 females, there were 86.4 males. For every 100 females age 18 and over, there were 82.4 males.

The median household income was $25,536 and the median family income was $44,375. Males had a median income of $29,500 and females $17,375. The per capita income was $19,598. About 3.2% of families and 10.2% of the population were below the poverty line, including 4.4% of those under age 18 and 16.5% of those age 65 or over.

Attractions
 Denbigh Experimental Forest

Climate
This climatic region is typified by large seasonal temperature differences, with warm to hot (and often humid) summers and cold (sometimes severely cold) winters. According to the Köppen Climate Classification system, Towner has a humid continental climate, abbreviated "Dfb" on climate maps.

References

External links
 TGU Towner School
 Centennial celebration, June 20-21, 1987, Zion Lutheran Church, Towner, North Dakota, 1887-1987 from the Digital Horizons website
Towner, North Dakota: community fact survey (1965) from the Digital Horizons website

Cities in McHenry County, North Dakota
Cities in North Dakota
County seats in North Dakota
Populated places established in 1886
Minot, North Dakota micropolitan area
1886 establishments in Dakota Territory